Matatua or Mataatua may refer to:

 Matatua (leafhopper), an insect genus in the tribe Empoascini
 Mātaatua, a voyaging canoe used by Polynesians to migrate to New Zealand in Māori tradition
 SS Matatua, a UK cargo ship shipwrecked and refloated in 1924

See also
 HMNZS Matataua, of the Royal New Zealand Navy
 Mataguá, Cuba
 Matatā, North Island, New Zealand
 Matatu, Kenyan minibuses